The Sulaiman markhor or straight-horned markhor (Capra falconeri jerdoni) is a goat endemic to Asia. It is a subspecies of Capra falconeri.  Scientists differ regarding whether it is the same subspecies as the Kabul markhor.

References

Caprids
Mammals of Asia